Thomas Tomlins may refer to:
Sir Thomas Edlyne Tomlins (1762–1841), English legal writer 
Thomas Edlyne Tomlins (1803–1875), English legal writer

See also
Thomas Tomlin (disambiguation)